Jo Jong-chul (born 12 September 1990) is a North Korean footballer. He represented North Korea on at least one occasion in 2014.

Career statistics

International

References

1990 births
Living people
North Korean footballers
North Korea international footballers
Association football midfielders